Two concepts or things are commensurable if they are measurable or comparable by a common standard.

Commensurability most commonly refers to commensurability (mathematics). It may also refer to:

 Commensurability (astronomy), whether two orbital periods are mathematically commensurate.
 Commensurability (crystal structure), whether periodic material properties repeat over a distance that is mathematically commensurate with the length of the unit cell.
 Commensurability (economics), whether economic value can always be measured by money
 Commensurability (ethics), the commensurability of values in ethics
 Commensurability (group theory), when two groups have a subgroup of finite index in common
 Commensurability (philosophy of science)
 Unit commensurability, a concept in dimensional analysis that concerns conversion of units of measurement
Apples and oranges, common idiom related to incommensurability

it:Incommensurabilità
simple:Incommensurability
sv:Inkommensurabilitet